Dolicharthria stigmosalis is a species of moth in the family Crambidae. It is found in France, Austria, Hungary, Croatia, Greece, the Republic of Macedonia, Bulgaria, Romania, Ukraine and Turkey.

References

Moths described in 1848
Spilomelinae
Moths of Europe
Moths of Asia